Importin subunit alpha-1 is a protein that in humans is encoded by the KPNA2 gene.

The import of proteins into the nucleus is a process that involves at least 2 steps. The first is an energy-independent docking of the protein to the nuclear envelope and the second is an energy-dependent translocation through the nuclear pore complex. Imported proteins require a nuclear localization sequence (NLS) which generally consists of a short region of basic amino acids or 2 such regions spaced about 10 amino acids apart. Proteins involved in the first step of nuclear import are members of the alpha importin family of karyopherins such as importin subunit alpha-1. These include the Xenopus protein importin and its yeast homolog, SRP1 (a suppressor of certain temperature-sensitive mutations of RNA polymerase I in Saccharomyces cerevisiae), which bind to the NLS. KPNA2 protein interacts with the NLSs of DNA helicase Q1 and SV40 T antigen and may be involved in the nuclear transport of proteins. KPNA2 also may play a role in V(D)J recombination

Interactions 

Karyopherin alpha 2 has been shown to interact with:

 ARL4A 
 ITK,
 KPNB1, 
 PLAG1, 
 RECQL,  and
 SGK.

References

Further reading 

 
 
 
 
 
 
 
 
 
 
 
 
 
 
 
 
 
 

Armadillo-repeat-containing proteins